Olenivka is an urban-type settlement in Donetsk Oblast, Ukraine. According to the Ukrainian government, which does not control the settlement, it is located in Horlivka Raion. According to Russia, which illegally occupies the area, it is located in Bakhmut Raion (which Russia recognizes as Artemivsk Raion). It has a population of

History 

The settlement dates back from at least 1859, when it was mentioned in documents of the Ministry of the Interior of the Russian Empire. In 2014 Olenivka was seized by the Russian-backed Donetsk People's Republic.

In the 2022 Russian invasion of Ukraine, Russian forces conducted "filtering" of people from occupied Mariupol in the settlement. All relatives of the Ukrainian military of the Armed Forces, former law enforcement officers, activists, journalists, and "suspicious" people were taken to the former penal colony No. 52 in Olenivka or to Izolyatsia prison in Donetsk.

Demographics 
According to the 2001 Ukrainian census, the settlement had a population of 964. Their native languages were 12.55% Ukrainian, 87.45% Russian.

References 

Urban-type settlements in Horlivka Raion